Thomas Hannay (10 June 1887 - 31 January 1970) was an Anglican bishop.

Biography 
Hannay was educated at the University of Liverpool and Queens' College, Cambridge and ordained in 1910. He began his career with a curacy in Holmfirth  after which he with the Universities’ Mission to Central Africa in Nyasaland. In 1927 he came to the College of the Resurrection, Mirfield and was its Principal from 1933 to 1941.

He became Bishop of Argyll and The Isles in 1942, and in 1952 Primus of the Scottish Episcopal Church; retiring from both posts in 1962.

References

1887 births
Alumni of the University of Liverpool
Alumni of Queens' College, Cambridge
Alumni of the College of the Resurrection
Bishops of Argyll and The Isles
20th-century Scottish Episcopalian bishops
Bishops of Edinburgh
Primuses of the Scottish Episcopal Church
20th-century Anglican archbishops
Holders of a Lambeth degree
1970 deaths